Hajji Ahmad may refer to:

 Hajji Ahmad, a village located in Zanjan Province, Iran
 Hajji Ahmad Kandi, a village located in West Azerbaijan Province, Iran
 Hajji Ahmad Shahvazayi, a village located in Sistan and Baluchestan Province, Iran